Evening dress, evening attire, or evening wear may refer to:
 Evening gown or evening dress
 Full evening dress or white tie, a formal Western dress code
 Black tie, a semi-formal Western dress code for evening events
 Evening Attire (horse), an American Thoroughbred racehorse
 Evening Attire Stakes, an annual Thoroughbred horse race in Queens, New York

See also
 Full dress uniform, a permitted supplementary alternative equivalent to the civilian white tie for evening wear
 Mess dress uniform, a permitted supplementary alternative equivalent to the civilian black tie for evening wear